Soma Laishram (born 5 January 1992) is an Indian actress and singer who appears in Manipuri films. She is a native of Imphal, Manipur. Nurei, Hoo Chaage, Loibataare Ta Raju, and Chanu IPS are some of her famous movies.

In September 2021, Laishram joined the Republican Party of India - Athawale (RPI-A) and assumed the post of state unit president of its youth girls’ wing.

Early life and education
She did her schooling from Little Flowers School and Temple of Learning, Imphal. She completed her Bachelor of Arts from CMJ University.

Career 
Laishram appeared in teleplays, drama and anchored as a programme presenter in DDK Imphal.

Her first music video album was Hey Girl alongside Mahes Thounaojam. Her first film was Phijang Marumda, where she is playing a MBBS student, alongside Rajkumar Kaiku in a supporting role. After this, she has done a number of Manipuri films. Among the notable ones are Loibataare Ta Raju, Ang Tamo, Amamba Sayon,  Hoo Chaage, Toro, Hingbagee Mahao, and Nangna Nokpa Yengningi.

She played a sub inspector in the 2012 movie Ang Tamo. A solo music album Angaoba Malang was also released where she sang in her own voice and acted. As of 2017, she has acted in a Meitei-Portuguese music video Nura Pakhang (Eu e Tu), directed by Romi Meitei and sung by Mangka Mayanglambam and Manuela Clã. In 2021, she was seen in Homeshwori's directorial venture Ima Machet Icha Tangkhai.

Accolades
Laishram won the Best Actor Award - Female for her role Thoinu in the film Enakta Leiringei at the 11th Manipuri State Film Awards 2018. She won the Best Supporting Actor - Female award at the 10th MANIFA 2022 for her role in the film Ima Machet Icha Tangkhai.

Off-screen work
Laishram was the brand ambassador of Kaizen Sports along with Hamom Sadananda and Oinam Bembem Devi.

Selected filmography

References

Indian film actresses
Living people
1992 births
Singers from Manipur
Meitei people
People from Imphal
Actresses from Manipur
Actresses in Meitei cinema
Indian women playback singers
21st-century Indian actresses
21st-century Indian women singers
21st-century Indian singers